Oak Mountain High School is a four-year public high school in the northern Shelby County suburbs of Birmingham, Alabama. It is part of Shelby County School Schools.

Academics

College preparation 
Oak Mountain students can take one or more of the following 16 Advanced Placement courses:

 Biology
 Calculus
 Chemistry
 English Language & Composition
 English Literature & Composition
 Environmental Science
 European History
 French
 Latin
 Macroeconomics
 Physics
 Spanish
 Studio Art
 US Government & Politics
 US History
 World History

Oak Mountain students are also eligible for dual enrollment at Jefferson State Community College, allowing them to earn high school and college credit simultaneously.

Athletics 
Oak Mountain competes in AHSAA Class 7A athletics and fields teams in the following sports:

 Baseball
 Basketball
 Bowling
 Cheerleading
 Cross Country
 Football
 Golf
 Outdoor Track & Field
 Soccer
 Softball
 Swimming & Diving
 Tennis
 Volleyball
 Wrestling

Oak Mountain's soccer programs have been two of the best programs in the country during the last twenty years. The boys' soccer team won four 6A state championships, in 2005, 2007, 2008, and 2011, as well as three consecutive 7A championships from 2015-2017. In addition to these state championships, the Eagles were voted as national champions in 2005 and 2016. The girls' soccer program has been very successful, as well, winning AHSAA Class 6A titles in 2012 and 2014, and Class 7A championships in 2015 and 2021, being named national champions by MaxPreps in 2014. 

On the hardwood, the Eagles have found recent success, advancing to their first-ever state semifinal birth in 2020, where the Eagles lost to eventual champion R. E. Lee-Montgomery. In 2021, the Eagles once again advanced to the AHSAA Final Four, this time finding success in the two games, winning the team's first AHSAA state championship, at any classification, after defeating the Enterprise Wildcats 41-37.

Notable alumni 
 Kevin Garver ('06), American football coach
 Merritt Mathias ('07), Professional soccer player
 Chandler Hoffman ('08), Professional soccer player
 John Ball ('08), Christian musician
 David Dahl ('12), MLB baseball player for the Milwaukee Brewers
 Nealy Martin ('15), Professional soccer player
 Callie Walker ('16), Miss Alabama 2018 (Top 10 at Miss America)

References

External links
Oak Mountain High School homepage

Public high schools in Alabama
Educational institutions established in 1999
Schools in Shelby County, Alabama
1999 establishments in Alabama